SZK may refer to:

 IATA code for Skukuza Airport
 Statistical zero knowledge, a computational complexity class introduced by Salil Vadhan
 Organization of the Kurdish language in People's Council of West Kurdistan
 szk, ISO code for the Ikizu language
 Slovenská živnostenská komora, a political lobbying group in Politics of Slovakia